Thérèse Anaïs Rigo, better known by her pseudonyms Anaïs de Bassanville and Comtesse de Bassanville, was a 19th-century French writer and women's magazine journalist. She authored numerous works about good manners. She was born in 1802 in Auteuil, Seine (now Paris) and died on 6 November 1884 in the same town.

History

She was the disciple of Henriette Campan. She started writing at the age of 40 under the pseudonym Comtesse de Bassanville (Countess of Bassanville). She founded the Journal des jeunes filles. Moreover, she was the direction of Le moniteur des dames et des demoiselles from 1986 to 1850 and of Le dimanche des familles from 1856 to 1858.

In 1867, she released her book Code du cérémonial : Guide des gens du monde dans toutes les circonstances de la vie that explained the rule of good manners. The book faced negative criticism at first, but became successful and was re-published several times.

Bassanville died in November 1884 in Auteuil, Seine and was buried at Père Lachaise Cemetery (1st division).

Published works 
 Les aventures d'une épingle ou Trois siècles de l'histoire de France, 267 p., Paris, Aubert, 1846 
 La corbeille de fleurs, 1848
 Les mémoires d'une jeune fille, 1849
 Le monde tel qu'il est, 1853
 Les primeurs de la vie, 1854
 Délassements de l'enfance, 1856
 Les épis d'une glaneuse, 1858
 les Deux familles, 1859
 Les salons d'autrefois, souvenirs intimes, 4 vol. in-18,  Paris, P. Brunet, 1861-1863
 De l'éducation des femmes, 1861
 Les Contes du bonhomme jadis, 1861
 L'entrée dans le monde, 1862
 Les Secrets d'une jeune fille, 1863
 Les Ouvriers illustres, 1863
 Code du cérémonial : Guide des gens du monde dans toutes les circonstances de la vie, 
 Beauté et bonté ; La Folle du logis, 126 p., Paris, A. Hatier, 1902

References

1802 births
1884 deaths
19th-century French women writers
19th-century French journalists
French women journalists
Writers from Paris
Burials at Père Lachaise Cemetery
19th-century pseudonymous writers
Pseudonymous women writers
19th-century women journalists